Seamus Maloney is a former Australian rules footballer who played for Sturt in the South Australian National Football League (SANFL) from 1996 to 2003. For four seasons from 2012 he was the head coach of the Sturt Football Club, resigning from the role at the end the 2015 season.

Playing career 
Playing as a running defender/half back, Maloney played 152 games for Sturt from 1996 to 2003, winning the best and fairest in 2001 and was acting captain for the 2002 premiership.

SANFL retirement 
In 2004, Maloney moved to Mildura and returned to Imperials in the Sunraysia Football League where he played in the 2004 premiership and coached them (as a playing coach) to the 2005 and 2008 premierships.  In 2011, he returned to Adelaide where he re-joined Sturt as an assistant coach.

Coaching 
Maloney was appointed as coach of Sturt following the end of the 2011 season, his contract was extended at the end of the 2013 season.  He resigned from Sturt at the end of the 2015 season.

Coaching statistics

References 

Living people
Sturt Football Club coaches
Sturt Football Club players
Australian rules footballers from Victoria (Australia)
Year of birth missing (living people)